Como is a town in Panola County, Mississippi, which borders the Mississippi Delta and is in the northern part of the state, known as hill country. The population was 1,279 as of the 2010 census.

History
In a 2007 article about the area, Wayne Drash, a CNN.com senior producer, described Como as "a hard-hit rural community."

Geography

Demographics

2020 census

As of the 2020 United States Census, there were 1,118 people, 590 households, and 284 families residing in the town.

2000 census
As of the census of 2000, there were 1,310 people, 461 households, and 352 families residing in the town. The population density was 692.1 people per square mile (267.6/km2). There were 506 housing units at an average density of 267.3 per square mile (103.4/km2). The racial makeup of the town was 71.83% African American, 26.79% White, 0.08% Native American, 0.61% from other races, and 0.69% from two or more races. Hispanic or Latino of any race were 1.15% of the population.

There were 461 households, out of which 34.5% had children under the age of 18 living with them, 39.7% were married couples living together, 31.0% had a female householder with no husband present, and 23.6% were non-families. 22.1% of all households were made up of individuals, and 11.9% had someone living alone who was 65 years of age or older. The average household size was 2.84 and the average family size was 3.30.

In the town, the population was spread out, with 30.1% under the age of 18, 9.8% from 18 to 24, 24.5% from 25 to 44, 20.6% from 45 to 64, and 15.0% who were 65 years of age or older. The median age was 34 years. For every 100 females, there were 81.2 males. For every 100 females age 18 and over, there were 74.8 males.

The median income for a household in the town was $22,344, and the median income for a family was $25,000. Males had a median income of $28,333 versus $18,977 for females. The per capita income for the town was $12,278. About 31.3% of families and 37.5% of the population were below the poverty line, including 57.2% of those under age 18 and 29.6% of those age 65 or over.

Education
The Town of Como is served by the North Panola School District. Como Elementary School in Como, North Panola Junior High School in Como, and North Panola High School in Sardis serve the community.

Infrastructure
The United States Postal Service operates the Como Post Office.

Notable people

Joe Henderson, R&B and gospel singer who had a 1962 hit with "Snap Your Fingers" was born in Como.
Mississippi Fred McDowell, Jessie Mae Hemphill, Napoleon Strickland, Othar Turner, and R.L. Boyce are noted Hill Country blues musicians who lived in or near Como. 
Tommy Joe Martins, racecar driver, was born in Como.
Jimbo Mathus, musician, has lived in Como since 2007, where he also runs the Delta Recording Studio, which records artists from around the world. 
Sharon McConnell-Dickerson, sculptor, lives and works in Como; she has created life castings of over 50 blues musicians.
L. H. Musgrove was born in Como and moved to the American West. An outlaw, he was sprung from jail in Denver, Colorado, in the fall of 1868 and lynched by a vigilante mob.
Luther Perkins, guitarist who played for singer Johnny Cash, spent most of his childhood in Como.
Stark Young was born and grew up in Como. He became a novelist, best known for So Red the Rose (1934), adapted as a 1935 film by the same name. A member of the Southern Agrarians, he had taught in academia for several years before moving to New York City, where he also wrote several plays and worked as theatre critic for The New Republic and The New York Times.

References

Towns in Panola County, Mississippi
Towns in Mississippi